Lubna Azabal (born 15 August 1973) is a Belgian actress of Moroccan–Spanish descent.

Career
Azabal was born on 15 August 1973 in Brussels to a Moroccan father and a Spanish mother.

After studying at the Royal Conservatory of Brussels, she began a theatrical career in Belgium. In 1997, she took her first film role when Belgian film-maker Vincent Lannoo chose her to act beside Olivier Gourmet in his short film J'adore le cinéma. She performs in English, French and Arabic. She was raised trilingual (French, Spanish and Berber).

Her most widely known film role is in the 2005 political thriller, Paradise Now. She appears in a smaller role in Ridley Scott's Body of Lies. She has a lead part alongside Maggie Gyllenhaal in Hugo Blick's 2014 BBC TV miniseries The Honourable Woman.

Azabal won the Black Pearl Award 2010 (Abu Dhabi Film Festival) for Best Actress for her role in the film Incendies. She also won the Genie Award for Best Performance by an Actress in a Leading Role at the 31st Genie Awards and the Magritte Award for Best Actress at the 2nd Magritte Awards. She starred opposite Ben Foster in the independent film Here (2011).

In 2018, Azabal appeared as Susannah in Helen Edmundson's film Mary Magdalene.

Selected filmography

Pure Fiction (1998)
Les Siestes grenadine (1999) - Mabrouka
Loin (2001) - Sarah
Un monde presque paisible (2002) - Jacqueline
Aram (2002) - Méliné
Une minute de soleil en moins (2002, TV Movie) - Touria
25 degrés en hiver (2004) - Loubna
Viva Laldjérie (2004) - Goucem
Exils (2004) - Naima
Changing Times (Les temps qui changent) (2004) - Nadia / Aïcha
Paradise Now (2005) - Suha
Strangers (2007) - Rana Sweid
24 mesures (2007) - Helly
Body of Lies (2008) - Aisha's Sister Cala
Occupation (2009, TV Mini-Series) - Aliya Nabil
Gamines (2009) - Angela Di Biaggio
Une chaîne pour deux (2009) - Corinne
Comme les cinq doigts de la main (2010) - Amel Zeroual
Incendies (2010) - Nawal Marwan
I Am Slave (2010)
Captifs (2010)
Here (2011) - Gadarine Nazarian
Coriolanus (2011) - First Citizen (Tamora)
Lipstikka (2011)
Free Men (2011) - Leila
Headwinds (2011) - La mère de Yamine
Goodbye Morocco (2012) - Dounia
Rock the Casbah (2013) - Kenza
The Marchers (2013) - Kheira
The Honourable Woman (2014, TV Mini-Series) - Atika Halabi
Grain (2015)
The Missing Paper (2016) - Valja
The Frozen Dead (2016-2017, TV Series) - Elisabeth Ferney
Light Thereafter (2017) - Soumaya
Lola Pater (2017) - Malika, la mère de Zino
Grain (2017) - Beatrice
Catch the Wind (2017) - Nadia
Above the Law (2017) - Lucie Tesla
Mary Magdalene (2018) - Susannah
A Bluebird in My Heart (2018) - Nadia
Sofia (2018) - Leila
Tel Aviv on Fire (2018) - Tala / Manal aka Rachel
Hellhole (2019) - Samira
Adam (2019) - Abla
The blue caftan (2022) - Mina

Selected stage appearances
Doña Rosita la soltera by Federico García Lorca (1999)
L’Horloge et le désert by Ghassan Kanafani (2000)
Une nuit arabe by Roland Schimmelpfenning (2002)
Le Tampon vert by Aziz Chouaki (2003)
L’Île aux esclaves by Marivaux (2006)

Awards
Nominated: 2022 Magritte Award - Best Actress for Adam
Nominated: 2020 Magritte Award - Best Actress for Tel Aviv on Fire
Winner: 2019 Magritte Award - Best Actress for Above the Law
Winner: 2015 Magritte Award - Best Supporting Actress for The Marchers
Nominated: 2014 Magritte Award - Best Actress for Goodbye Marocco
Winner: 2012 Magritte Award - Best Actress for Incendies
Winner: 2011 31st Genie Awards - Genie Award for Best Performance by an Actress in a Leading Role for Incendies
Winner: 2011 Jutra Award - Best Actress for Incendies
Winner: 2011 Vancouver Film Critics Circle Award for Best Actress in a Canadian Film for Incendies
Winner: 2007 Jerusalem Film Festival - Most Promising Actress for Strangers

References

External links

Video interview for European television (English)

Belgian film actresses
Belgian people of Moroccan descent
Belgian people of Berber descent
Belgian people of Moroccan-Berber descent
1973 births
Living people
Best Actress Genie and Canadian Screen Award winners
Magritte Award winners
Belgian people of Spanish descent
Moroccan people of Spanish descent
21st-century Belgian actresses
Royal Conservatory of Brussels alumni
Best Actress Jutra and Iris Award winners